3rd Multi-member Constituency - Varna is a constituency whose borders are the same as Varna Province in Bulgaria.

Background
In the 2009 Bulgarian parliamentary election 3rd MMC – Varna elected 13 members in the Bulgarian National Assembly, 12 of which were through proportionality vote and 1 through first-past-the-post voting.

Members in the Bulgarian National Assembly
 Through first-past-the-post voting

 Through proportionality vote

Elections
2009

 proportionality vote

 first-past-the-post voting

See also
2009 Bulgarian parliamentary election
Politics of Bulgaria
List of Bulgarian Constituencies

References

Electoral divisions in Bulgaria
Varna Province